Dinamo Residential Complex is a constructivist building complex in Tsentralny City District of Novosibirsk, Russia. It is located on the corner of Krasny Avenue and Oktyabrskaya Street. The complex was built in 1934–1936. Architects: Boris Gordeyev, S. P. Turgenev, V. N. Nikitin. It included a hotel and residential buildings for NKVD employees.

Description
The Dinamo Complex included a hotel, a hairdresser, a kindergarten, a Dynamo Shop, a laundry room, and a residential complex.

Hotel
The hotel had a restaurant, its staff consisted of NKVD agents. They overheard conversations of restaurant visitors.

Residential Complex
Residential complex was built for NKVD employees. It consists of two sectors. The first sector was built in 1934, the second sector was constructed in 1936. The apartments had no kitchens, but there was a mechanical cafeteria for the residents of the complex.

See also
 NKVD House (Serebrennikovskaya Street 16)
 NKVD House (Serebrennikovskaya Street 23)

References

Tsentralny City District, Novosibirsk
Buildings and structures in Novosibirsk
Constructivist architecture
Buildings and structures completed in 1936